Air Vice Marshal David Francis William Atcherley,  (12 January 1904 – 8 June 1952) was a senior Royal Air Force officer.

Early life
David Atcherley and his twin Richard were born on 12 January 1904, and were the sons of Major General Sir Llewellyn Atcherley, Chief Constable of the West Riding of Yorkshire, and his wife "Nellie", Eleanor Frances (1871–1957), daughter of Richard Mickelthwait, of Ardsley House, in the valley of Deane near Barnsley. Their father was a grandson of David Francis Atcherley of Marton Hall, High Sheriff of Shropshire, Serjeant-at-law, Attorney-General of the County Palatine of Lancaster and County Durham. David Atcherley and his brother, first cousins of William Empson, attended Oundle School in Northamptonshire.

RAF career in the Second World War
Atcherley entered Sandhurst Military Academy in 1922. In 1924 he was commissioned into the East Lancashire Regiment.

At the start of the war he was Commanding Officer of No. 85 Squadron. He commanded No. 253 Squadron in May 1940.

Atcherley became the Commanding Officer at RAF Fairwood Common in 1942 and was responsible for collecting Oberleutnant Armin Faber from RAF Pembrey when he landed his Focke-Wulf 190 there on 23 June 1942.

Towards the end of the war he served as senior air staff officer in No. 2 Group.

Disappearance and presumed death
In June 1952, Atcherley was lost at sea, presumed dead whilst piloting a Meteor jet fighter PR Mk.10 ( from No. 13 Squadron). He took off from RAF Kabrit in Egypt at approximately 11.30 am for a 40-minute flight to Nicosia in Cyprus. His aircraft never arrived at Nicosia, and no radio message was received. No trace of Atcherley or his aircraft was ever found despite an extensive air-sea search being carried out by British, Israeli, Turkish and American aircraft.

Honours and awards
29 July 1941 – Distinguished Flying Cross – Wing Commander David Francis William Atcherley, Royal Air Force.

14 July 1944 – Distinguished Service Order – Acting Air Commodore David Francis William Atcherley, Royal Air Force.

See also
List of people who disappeared mysteriously at sea

References

1904 births
1950s missing person cases
1952 deaths
Aviators killed in aviation accidents or incidents
Companions of the Distinguished Service Order
Commanders of the Order of the British Empire
Companions of the Order of the Bath
Military personnel from York
People educated at Oundle School
Missing aviators
Officers of the Order of Leopold II
People lost at sea
Recipients of the Croix de guerre (Belgium)
Recipients of the Distinguished Flying Cross (United Kingdom)
Royal Air Force air marshals
Royal Air Force pilots of World War II
Victims of aviation accidents or incidents in 1952
Graduates of the Royal Military College, Sandhurst
East Lancashire Regiment officers